Matthew Stephen Sinatro (born March 22, 1960, in Hartford, Connecticut) is an American former professional baseball player, coach and scout. A catcher during his playing days, he appeared in 140 games over ten seasons in Major League Baseball (MLB) for four clubs: the Atlanta Braves (1981–84), Oakland Athletics (1987–88), Detroit Tigers (1989) and Seattle Mariners (1990–92), and had a 15-year career as an MLB coach.

After graduating from Conard High School in West Hartford, he was selected by the Braves in the second round of the 1978 Major League Baseball Draft. He was the 27th player chosen overall, 21 slots ahead of eventual Baseball Hall of Famer Cal Ripken Jr.

But offensive struggles (he batted only .245 during a 1,044-game minor league career) hindered Sinatro's development. He was never a regular player in the big leagues, nor did he play in more than 37 games in any MLB season. His 48 career big-league hits included six doubles, one triple, and one home run, a two-run blow off Pete Falcone of the New York Mets on August 27, 1982. The homer contributed to a 9–8 Atlanta victory in a year when the Braves prevailed over the Los Angeles Dodgers to win the National League West Division championship by a single game.

After drawing his release from the Mariners in October 1992, Sinatro was Seattle's MLB advance scout in 1993–94 before joining the big-league coaching staff of manager Lou Piniella. He would spend his entire coaching career working for Piniella as bullpen coach, first-base coach or special assistant with the Mariners, Tampa Bay Devil Rays and Chicago Cubs. In 2012, he served the Houston Astros as catching coordinator and advance scout.

References

External links

1960 births
Living people
American expatriate baseball players in Canada
Atlanta Braves players
Baseball coaches from Connecticut
Baseball players from Hartford, Connecticut
Buffalo Bisons (minor league) players
Calgary Cannons players
Chicago Cubs coaches
Detroit Tigers players
Greenwood Braves players
Houston Astros scouts
Kingsport Braves players
Major League Baseball bullpen coaches
Major League Baseball catchers
Major League Baseball first base coaches
Oakland Athletics players
Richmond Braves players
Savannah Braves players
Seattle Mariners coaches
Seattle Mariners players
Seattle Mariners scouts
Sportspeople from Hartford, Connecticut
Tacoma Tigers players
Tampa Bay Devil Rays coaches
Tucson Toros players